Aljaž Bratec (born May 31, 1998) is a Slovenian professional basketball player for Helios Suns of the Slovenian League. He is a 1.92 m tall combo guard.

Professional career
Bratec started playing professional basketball for Helios Suns Domžale.

International career
Bratec made his debut for the Slovenian national team on September 14, 2018, at the 2019 FIBA Basketball World Cup qualification game against Latvia national team.

References

External links
 Eurobasket.com profile
 REALGM profile
 PROBALLERS profile

1998 births
Living people
Point guards
Shooting guards
Slovenian men's basketball players
Helios Suns players